The Three Palladins is a novel of historical fiction by Harold Lamb.  It was first published in book form in 1977 by Donald M. Grant, Publisher, Inc. in an edition of 1,350 copies.  The novel originally appeared in the magazine Adventure in 1923.

Plot introduction
The novel is an adventure story about the rise of Genghis Khan and the fabled kingdom of Prester John.

References

1977 American novels
American fantasy novels
Works originally published in Adventure (magazine)
Donald M. Grant, Publisher books